Mickey Charles Mantle (October 20, 1931 – August 13, 1995), nicknamed "the Commerce Comet" and "the Mick", was an American professional baseball player. Mantle played his entire Major League Baseball (MLB) career (1951–1968) with the New York Yankees as a center fielder, right fielder, and first baseman. Mantle was one of the best players and sluggers of all time, and is regarded by many as the greatest switch hitter in baseball history. Mantle was inducted into the Baseball Hall of Fame in 1974 and was elected to the Major League Baseball All-Century Team in 1999.

Mantle was one of the greatest offensive threats in baseball history and is considered to be one of the best baseball players of all time. He has the third highest career OPS+ among MLB players who played the majority of their career after 1950, behind only Barry Bonds and Mike Trout. He had the highest stolen-base percentage in history at the time of his retirement. In addition, compared to the other four center fielders on the All-Century team, he had the lowest career rate of grounding into double plays, and he had the highest World Series on-base percentage and World Series slugging percentage. He also had an excellent .984 fielding percentage when playing center field. Mantle was able to hit for both average and power, especially tape-measure home runs, a term that was born when a play-by-play caller reacted to one of Mantle's 1953 home runs. He hit 536 career home runs, batted .300 or more ten times, and is the career leader (tied with Jim Thome) in walk-off home runs, with 13: 12 in the regular season and one in the postseason. He is the only player in history to hit 150 home runs from both sides of the plate. Mantle is 16th all-time in home runs per at-bats. He is 17th in on-base percentage. He was safe 8 out of 10 times in which he attempted to steal a base. Mantle was also known for his incredible ability to avoid grounding into double plays. For every 100 at bats, Mantle grounded into 1.40 double plays, one of the lowest marks in history. In both 1953 and 1961, he hit into only two double plays, over the course of 1,186 plate appearances. He won the MVP award three times, finished second three times, and finished within nine votes of winning five times.

Mantle won the Triple Crown in 1956, when he led the major leagues in batting average (.353), home runs (52), and runs batted in (RBI) (130). He later wrote a book (My Favorite Summer 1956) about his best year in baseball. He was an All-Star for 16 seasons, playing in 16 of the 20 All-Star Games that were played during his career. He was an American League (AL) Most Valuable Player (MVP) three times and a Gold Glove winner once. Mantle appeared in 12 World Series including seven championships, and he holds World Series records for the most home runs (18), RBIs (40), extra-base hits (26), runs (42), walks (43), and total bases (123). Despite his accolades on the field, Mantle's private life was plagued with tumult and tragedy, including a well-publicized bout with alcoholism that led to his death from liver cancer.

Early years
Mantle was born on October 20, 1931, in Spavinaw, Oklahoma, the son of Lovell (née Richardson) Mantle (1904–1995) and Elvin Charles "Mutt" Mantle (1912–1952). He was of at least partial English ancestry; his great-grandfather George Mantle left Brierley Hill, in England's Black Country, in 1848. Mutt named his son in honor of Mickey Cochrane, a Hall of Fame catcher. Later in his life, Mantle expressed relief that his father had not known Cochrane's true first name because he would have hated to be named Gordon. Mantle spoke warmly of his father and said that he was the bravest man whom he had ever known. "No boy ever loved his father more," he said. Mantle batted left-handed against his father when his father pitched to him right-handed, and he batted right-handed against his grandfather, Charles Mantle, when he pitched to him left-handed. His grandfather died at the age of 60 in 1944, and his father died of Hodgkin's disease at the age of 40 on May 7, 1952.

When Mantle was four years old, his family moved to the nearby town of Commerce, Oklahoma, where his father worked in lead and zinc mines. As a teenager, Mantle rooted for the St. Louis Cardinals. In addition to his first love, baseball, Mantle was an all-around athlete at Commerce High School, playing basketball as well as football. He played halfback and Oklahoma offered him a football scholarship. His football playing nearly ended his athletic career. In his sophomore year, he was kicked on the left shin during a practice game, and he developed osteomyelitis—an infectious disease that was incurable just a few years earlier—in his left ankle. Mantle's parents drove him at midnight to Oklahoma City, where he was treated at the children's hospital with the newly available penicillin, which reduced the infection and saved his leg from amputation.

Professional baseball

Minor leagues (1948–1950)
Mantle began his professional baseball career in Kansas with the semi-professional Baxter Springs Whiz Kids. In 1948, Yankees scout Tom Greenwade came to Baxter Springs to watch Mantle's teammate, third baseman Willard "Billy" Johnson. During the game, Mantle hit three home runs. Greenwade returned in 1949, after Mantle's high school graduation, to sign Mantle to a minor league contract. Mantle signed for $140 per month with a $1,500 signing bonus.

Mantle was assigned to the Yankees' Class-D Independence Yankees of the Kansas–Oklahoma–Missouri League, where he played shortstop. During a slump, Mantle called his father to tell him he wanted to quit baseball. Mutt drove to Independence, Kansas, and convinced Mantle to keep playing. Mantle hit .313 for the Independence Yankees. Shulthis Stadium, the baseball stadium in Independence where Mantle played, had been the site of the first night game of organized baseball in 1930. Mantle hit his first professional home run on June 30, 1949, at Shulthis Stadium. The ball went over the center field fence, which was 460 feet from home plate. In 1950, Mantle was promoted to the Class-C Joplin Miners of the Western Association. Mantle won the Western Association batting title, with a .383 average. He also hit 26 home runs and recorded 136 runs batted in. However, Mantle struggled defensively at shortstop.

Major leagues, New York Yankees (1951–1968)

Rookie season: 1951

Mantle was invited to the Yankees instructional camp before the 1951 season. After an impressive spring training, Yankees manager Casey Stengel decided to promote Mantle to the majors as a right fielder instead of sending him to the minors. Mickey Mantle's salary for the 1951 season was $7,500.

Mantle was assigned uniform #6, signifying the expectation that he would become the next Yankees star, following Babe Ruth (#3), Lou Gehrig (#4) and Joe DiMaggio (#5). Stengel, speaking to SPORT, stated "He's got more natural power from both sides than anybody I ever saw." Bill Dickey called Mantle "the greatest prospect I've seen in my time."

After a brief slump, Mantle was sent down to the Yankees' top farm team, the Kansas City Blues. However, he was not able to find the power he once had in the lower minors. Out of frustration, he called his father one day and told him, "I don't think I can play baseball anymore." Mutt drove up to Kansas City that day. When he arrived, he started packing his son's clothes and, according to Mantle's memory, said "I thought I raised a man. I see I raised a coward instead. You can come back to Oklahoma and work the mines with me." Mantle immediately broke out of his slump, and went on to hit .361 with 11 homers and 50 RBIs during his stay in Kansas City.

Mantle was called up to the Yankees after 40 games with Kansas City, this time wearing uniform #7. He hit .267 with 13 home runs and 65 RBI in 96 games. In the second game of the 1951 World Series, New York Giants rookie Willie Mays hit a fly ball to right-center field. Mantle, playing right field, raced for the ball together with center fielder Joe DiMaggio, who called for the ball (and made the catch). In getting out of DiMaggio's way, Mantle tripped over an exposed drain pipe and severely injured his right knee. This was the first of numerous injuries that plagued his 18-year career with the Yankees. He played the rest of his career with a torn ACL.

Stardom: 1952–1964

Joe DiMaggio retired from baseball following the 1951 World Series. The following year, Mantle moved to center field. He was selected an "All-Star" for the first time and made the AL team, but did not play in the five-inning All-Star game that had Boston Red Sox Dom DiMaggio at center field. In his first complete World Series (1952), Mantle was the Yankees hitting star, with an on-base percentage above .400 and a slugging percentage above .600. He homered for the third Yankee run in a 3–2 Game 6 win and he knocked in the winning runs in the 4–2 Game 7 win, with a homer in the sixth inning and an RBI single in the seventh inning. Mantle played center field full-time for the Yankees until 1965, when he was moved to left field. He spent his final two seasons at first base. Among his many accomplishments are all-time World Series records for home runs (18), runs scored (42), and runs batted in (40).

The osteomyelitic condition of Mantle's left leg had exempted him from being drafted for military service since he was 18 in 1949, but his emergence as a star center fielder in the major leagues during the Korean War in 1952 led baseball fans to question his 4-F deferment. Two Armed Forces physicals were ordered, including a highly publicized exam on November 4, 1952, which was brought on by his All-Star selection, that ended in a final rejection. Mantle had high hopes that 1953 would be a breakout year but his momentum was stopped by an injury. He missed several weeks, so his numbers were modest but respectable, especially with 92 RBIs. Mantle had his first 100 plus RBI year, in 1954, in a full season and regained .300 status. The next was arguably his first great year, as he concluded with 37 home runs and a .306 batting average. With 37 homers, he was now a home run hitter, not just an all-around player with tremendous power.

Mantle had his breakout season in 1956 after showing progressive improvement each of his first five years. Described by him as his "favorite summer", his major league-leading .353 batting average, 52 home runs, and 130 runs batted in brought home both the Triple Crown and first of three Major League Baseball Most Valuable Player Awards. He also hit his second All-Star Game home run that season. During Game 5 of the 1956 World Series—Don Larsen's perfect game against the Brooklyn Dodgers—Mantle kept the perfect game alive by making a running catch of a deep fly ball off the bat of Gil Hodges, and provided the first of the two runs the Yankees would score with a fourth-inning home run off Brooklyn starter Sal Maglie. Mantle's overall performance in 1956 was so exceptional that he was bestowed the Hickok Belt (unanimously) as the top American professional athlete of the year. He is the only player to win a league Triple Crown as a switch hitter.

Mantle won his second consecutive MVP in 1957 behind league leads in runs and walks, a career-high .365 batting average (second to Ted Williams's .388), and hitting into a league-low five double plays. 
His batting average in mid-season had climbed as high as .392. His on-base percentage at one point, reached .537.
Mantle reached base more times than he made outs (319 to 312), one of two seasons in which he achieved the feat. The 1958 season started slowly for Mantle; the first half saw him at the .274 mark, as a shoulder injury from a collision with Braves' Red Schoendienst in the 1957 World Series left him with permanent struggles in his uppercut from the left side. (Another story says, he was badly injured playing touch football, at home, in the late summer of that year). Although his injury affected his upper cut from the right side, it still can be said he was not injured in 1958. 
He did, however, regain his status, hitting .330 in the second half of 1958, and leading his team back to the Series. In January 1959, the New York Times reported Mantle sought a contract raise to 85,000 dollars but he settled for 70,000. (His batting average closed 61 points lower than the previous year). 
The 1959 season was another frustrating situation; this time the first half of his season was good and his second-half comparatively bad. The season was bad for the Yankees, too, as they finished third. It was that year, also, he was timed running from home plate to first base in 3.1 seconds, considered outstanding for a heavy hitter. 1959 was the first of four consecutive seasons that two All-Star games were played and Mantle played in seven of these games. Mantle made the AL All-Star team as a reserve player in 1959, as his numbers had tailed off from previous seasons, he was used as a pinch runner for Baltimore Orioles catcher Gus Triandos and replacement right fielder for Cleveland Indians Rocky Colavito in the first game with Detroit Tigers Al Kaline playing the center field position. Mantle was the starting center fielder in the second All-Star Game's lineup, getting a single and a walk in four at bats. 
1959 is said to be his only "off season" in his prime, and historians point to 75 runs batted in as particularly low for him. However, as the team slumped overall, he was still the team leader in several departments, for example in base stealing (23), runs scored (104), on-base average /percentage (.399) and fielding (.995). Because of these comparatively low numbers, he took a salary cut of 10,000 dollars, down to 60,000 dollars. In 1960 Mantle started in both All-Star games, getting two walks in the first and a single in the second game. Mantle had another "off year"—indeed, the first week of June saw his batting average drop to .228—but by mid-August, he was back in his prime, leading the team to another World Series. Although his batting average was his lowest since his rookie year, his league-leading 40 home runs and 94 runs batted in, saw him come in a close second to Roger Maris's MVP award. His on-base percentage was .400, for the year.

In the 1960 season, he hit what is still believed to be the longest home run in history. He hit one over the right center field roof at Briggs Stadium, which is said to have traveled 643 feet.

On January 16, 1961, Mantle became the highest-paid player in baseball by signing a $75,000 contract. DiMaggio, Hank Greenberg, and Ted Williams, who had just retired, had been paid over $100,000 in a season, and Ruth had a peak salary of $80,000. Mantle became the highest-paid active player of his time. Mantle's top salary was $100,000, which he reached for the 1963 season. Having reached that pinnacle in his 13th season, he never asked for another raise.

M&M Boys

During the 1961 season, Mantle and teammate Roger Maris, known as the M&M Boys, chased Babe Ruth's 1927 single-season home run record. Five years earlier, in 1956, Mantle had challenged Ruth's record for most of the season, and the New York press had been protective of Ruth on that occasion also. When Mantle finally fell short, finishing with 52, many of the traditionalists were relieved. The New York press was harsh in its treatment of Mantle in his early years with the team, emphasizing that he struck out frequently, was injury-prone, was a rube from Oklahoma, and was perceived as inferior to his predecessor in center field, Joe DiMaggio.

Over the course of time, however, Mantle (with a little help from his teammate Whitey Ford, a native of Queens) had learned to deal with the New York media and had gained the favor of the press. Maris did not follow suit, and many in the press viewed him as surly. In the 1961 season, the press appeared to view the Yankees as Mantle's team, with Maris often belittled and ostracized as an outsider and not a true Yankee. Mantle was hospitalized with an abscessed hip resulting from a flu shot that he had received late in the season, leaving Maris to break the record (he finished with 61). Mantle finished with 54 home runs while leading the American league in runs scored and walks. For the second consecutive year, he narrowly missed winning his third MVP award, finishing four points behind repeat winner Maris.

In 1962, Mantle batted .321 in 121 games. He was selected an All-Star for the eleventh consecutive season and played in the first game, but because of a recurrence of an old injury, he did not play in the second game. Despite missing 41 games, he was selected as MVP for the third time, beating out teammate Bobby Richardson in the voting. In 1963, he batted .314 in 65 games. On May 22, Mantle hit a line-drive home run off the third-tier facade at Yankee Stadium, the closest that any hitter had come to hitting a fair ball out of the park. On June 5, he tried to prevent a home run by Brooks Robinson in Baltimore when his shoe spikes were caught in the center field chain-link fence as he leaped against the fence for the ball and was coming down. He broke his foot and did not play again until August 4, when he hit a pinch-hit home run against the Baltimore Orioles at Yankee Stadium. He returned to the center field position on September 2. He was selected an All-Star as the starting center fielder, but for the first time he could not make the 25-man roster because of the foot injury. In 1964, Mantle hit .303 with 35 home runs and 111 RBIs, and played center field in the All-Star game. In the bottom of the ninth inning of Game 3 of the 1964 World Series against the St. Louis Cardinals, Mantle hit Barney Schultz's first pitch into the right field stands at Yankee Stadium, which won the game for the Yankees 2–1. The home run was his 16th in a World Series, breaking Babe Ruth's record of 15. It also was perhaps his only "called shot", as he told on-deck hitter Elston Howard, "he might as well return to the dugout ...this game is over!" He hit two more home runs in the series to set a new lifetime World Series record with 18. The Cardinals won the World Series in seven games.

Mantle finished in second place in MVP voting for 1964, as Baltimore's Brooks Robinson won the award. In that season, he also hit another long home run at Yankee Stadium to left-center field that was reported to have traveled 502 feet.

Final seasons: 1965–1968
The Yankees and Mantle were slowed by injuries during the 1965 season, and they finished in sixth place, 25 games behind the Minnesota Twins. Mantle hit .255 with 19 home runs and 46 RBI in 361 plate appearances. He was selected an AL All-Star again, but as a reserve player, and he did not make the 28-player team for the second and last time because of an injury. To inaugurate the Astrodome, the world's first multi-purpose, domed sports stadium, the Houston Astros and the New York Yankees played an exhibition game on April 9, 1965. Mantle hit the park's first home run. In 1966, his batting average increased to .288 with 23 home runs and 56 RBI in 333 at-bats, in large part because of very strong June and July, when he returned to his 1964 form until he was sidelined with another injury. After the 1966 season, Mantle was moved to first base, with Joe Pepitone taking his place in the outfield. On May 14, 1967, Mantle became the sixth member of the 500 home run club.

Mantle hit .237 with 18 home runs and 54 RBI during his final season in 1968. The low batting average caused his lifetime average to dip below .300, which caused him anguish the next year as he worked with a statistician to review all of his at-bats since 1951, hoping to find enough uncounted hits to elevate his average to .2995, but his lifetime average remained .298.
 He was selected an AL All-Star and pinch-hit at the All-Star Game on July 11. Mantle was selected an All-Star every season during his 18-year career except 1951 and 1966, and did not play in the 1952, 1963, and 1965 seasons.

Retirement: 1969
Mantle announced his retirement at the age of 37 on March 1, 1969. He delivered a farewell speech on Mickey Mantle Day, June 8, 1969, at Yankee Stadium. Mantle's wife, mother, and mother-in-law were in attendance and received recognition at the ceremony held in honor of him. When he retired, Mantle was third on the all-time home-run list with 536, and he was the Yankees' all-time leader in games played with 2,401, a record that would be broken by Derek Jeter on August 29, 2011.

Player profile

Power hitting

Mantle hit some of the longest home runs in Major League history. On September 10, 1960, he hit a ball left-handed that cleared the right-field roof at Tiger Stadium in Detroit and, based on where it was found, was estimated years later by historian Mark Gallagher to have traveled 643 feet (196 m). Another Mantle homer, hit right-handed off Chuck Stobbs at Griffith Stadium in Washington, D.C., on April 17, 1953, was measured by Yankees traveling secretary Red Patterson (hence the term "tape-measure home run") to have traveled 565 feet (172 m). Deducting for bounces, there is no doubt that both landed well over 500 feet (152 m) from home plate. Mantle two times hit balls off the third-deck facade at Yankee Stadium, nearly becoming the only player to hit a fair ball out of the stadium during a game. It was later estimated by some that the ball could have traveled  had it not been blocked by the ornate and distinctive facade. On August 12, 1964, he hit one whose distance was undoubted: a center field drive that cleared the  batter's eye screen, some 75' beyond the  marker at the Stadium. The Daily News reported it as a 502-foot homer.

Although he was a feared power hitter from either side of the plate and hit more home runs batting left-handed than right, Mantle considered himself a better right-handed hitter. In roughly 25% of his total at-bats he hit .330 right-handed to .281 left. His 372 to-164 home run disparity was due to Mantle having batted left-handed much more often, as the large majority of pitchers are right-handed. In spite of short foul pole dimension of 296 feet (90 m) to left and 301 feet (92 m) to right in original Yankee Stadium, Mantle gained no advantage there as his stroke both left and right-handed drove balls there to power alleys of 344' to 407' and 402' to 457' feet (139 m) from the plate. Overall, he hit slightly more home runs away (270) than home (266).

Mantle was also one of the best bunters for base hits of all time. He is in 10th place in number of bases-empty bunt singles for his career, with 80 in only 148 at-bats.

Injuries
Mantle's career was plagued with injuries. Beginning in high school, he suffered both acute and chronic injuries to bones and cartilage in his legs. Applying thick wraps to both of his knees became a pre-game ritual, and by the end of his career simply swinging a bat caused him to fall to one knee in pain. Baseball scholars often ponder "what if" had he not been injured, and had been able to lead a healthy career.

As a 19-year-old rookie playing right field in his first World Series, Mantle tore the cartilage in his right knee on a fly ball hit by Willie Mays. Joe DiMaggio was playing center field. Mays's fly was hit to shallow center, and as Mantle came over to back up DiMaggio, Mantle's spikes caught a drainage cover in the outfield grass. His knee twisted awkwardly and he instantly fell. Witnesses say it looked "like he had been shot." He was carried off the field on a stretcher and watched the rest of the World Series on TV from a hospital bed. Dr. Stephen Haas, medical director for the National Football League Players Association, has speculated that Mantle tore his anterior cruciate ligament (ACL) during the incident and played the rest of his career without having it properly treated since ACLs could not be repaired with the surgical techniques available in that era. Still, Mantle was known as the "fastest man to first base" and won the American League triple crown in 1956. In 1949, he received a draft-examine notice and was about to be drafted by the US Army but failed the physical exam and was rejected as unqualified and was given a 4-F deferment for any military service.

During the 1957 World Series, Milwaukee Braves second baseman Red Schoendienst fell on Mantle's left shoulder in a collision at second base. Over the next decade, Mantle experienced increasing difficulty hitting from his left side.

Teammate
Mantle desired to be remembered as a stellar teammate. Joe Collins, who played with him from 1951 through 1957, recalled that "Mickey was the type of guy who cared about you as a person. As a teammate, he never complained about his injuries and always tried to lead by example. He always had that country boy attitude that made you feel at ease. He was a huge star, but he never treated you like he was better than you." Also displaying a sense of humor, he enjoyed playing practical jokes on his teammates. Frequently, he would dump ice water on those who were showering. Other times, he would leave fake snakes, bugs, or frogs around for Phil Rizzuto to find. Once, he put a live snake in Marshall Bridges's uniform, and another time he released a live mongoose into the visitors clubhouse at Tiger Stadium.

Later years

Mantle served as a part-time color commentator on NBC's baseball coverage in 1969, teaming with Curt Gowdy and Tony Kubek to call some Game of the Week telecasts as well as that year's All-Star Game. In 1972 he served as a part-time television commentator for the Montreal Expos.

In 1973, at the Old-Timers Game at Yankee Stadium, Mantle, batting right handed, faced old friend Whitey Ford. After fouling off a few pitches, he hit a towering home run over the 402-foot sign by the bullpen. Some now call this his last home run at Yankee Stadium.

Although he was among the best-paid players of the pre-free-agency era, Mantle was a poor businessman and did not invest well. His lifestyle was restored to its former luxury by his leadership in the sports-memorabilia craze that swept the U.S. beginning in the 1980s. Mantle was a prized guest at baseball-card shows, commanding fees far in excess of those of any other player for his appearances and autographs. Mantle insisted that the promoters of baseball-card shows always include one of the lesser-known Yankees of his era, such as Moose Skowron or Hank Bauer, so that they could also earn money for their appearances.

After the failure of Mickey Mantle's Country Cookin' restaurants in the early 1970s, the popular Mickey Mantle's Restaurant & Sports Bar opened in New York at 42 Central Park South (59th Street) in 1988. His original Yankee Stadium Monument Park plaque is displayed at the front entrance. Mantle let others run the business but made frequent appearances.

Mantle worked as a customer-relations representative for the Dallas Reserve Life Insurance Company. In 1983, he worked at the Claridge Resort and Casino in Atlantic City, New Jersey as a greeter and community representative. His job mostly involved representing the Claridge in golf tournaments and at other charity events, but Mantle was suspended from baseball by Commissioner Bowie Kuhn because any affiliation with gambling was viewed as grounds for placement on the "permanently ineligible" list. Kuhn warned Mantle before he accepted the position that he would be placed on the list if he took the job. Hall of Famer Willie Mays, who had taken a similar position, had already had action taken against him. Nevertheless, Mantle accepted the position because he felt the rule was "stupid." Mantle was reinstated on March 18, 1985, by Kuhn's successor Peter Ueberroth.

In 1992, Mantle wrote My Favorite Summer 1956 about his 1956 season.

Personal life

On December 23, 1951, Mantle married Merlyn Johnson (1932–2009) in Picher, Oklahoma; they had four sons. In an autobiography, Mantle said that he had married Merlyn not out of love, but because he was told to by his domineering father. While his drinking became public knowledge during his lifetime, the press kept quiet about his many marital infidelities. Mantle was not entirely discreet about them, and at his retirement ceremony in 1969, he brought his mistress along with his wife. In 1980, Mantle separated from his wife, and while the two lived apart for the rest of Mantle's life, they never filed for divorce. During this time, Mantle lived with his agent Greer Johnson.

The couple's four sons were Mickey Jr. (1953–2000), David (born 1955), Billy (1957–1994), whom Mickey named for Billy Martin, his best friend among his Yankee teammates, and Danny (born 1960). Like Mickey, Merlyn and three of their sons became alcoholics, and Billy developed Hodgkin's disease, as had several previous men in Mantle's family.

Mantle made an appearance in the music video for "Me and Julio Down by the Schoolyard" by Paul Simon in 1988. He batted left-handed hitting while Simon pitched left-handed.

During the final years of his life, Mantle purchased a condominium on Lake Oconee near Greensboro, Georgia, near Greer Johnson's home, and frequently stayed there for months at a time. He occasionally attended the local Methodist church, and sometimes ate Sunday dinner with members of the congregation. He was well-liked by the citizens of Greensboro, and seemed to like them in return. The town respected Mantle's privacy, refusing either to talk about him to outsiders or to direct fans to his home. In one interview, Mantle stated that the people of Greensboro had "gone out of their way to make me feel welcome, and I've found something there I haven't enjoyed since I was a kid."

Mantle's off-field behavior is the subject of the book The Last Boy: Mickey Mantle and the End of America's Childhood, written in 2010 by sports journalist Jane Leavy. Excerpts from the book have been published in Sports Illustrated.

Mantle was the uncle of actor and musician Kelly Mantle.

Illness and death
Mantle allegedly took his first drink of alcohol at age 19, when teammate Hank Bauer gave him a beer that he "chugged as if it were soda pop", according to baseball historian Frank Russo. Before Mantle sought treatment for alcoholism, he admitted that his hard living had hurt both his playing and his family. His rationale was that the men in his family had all died young, so he expected to die young as well. His father died of Hodgkin's disease at age 40 in 1952, and his grandfather also died young of the same disease. "I'm not gonna be cheated," he would say. At the time, Mantle did not know that most of the men in his family had inhaled lead and zinc dust in the mines, which can cause Hodgkin's disease and other cancers. He outlived all the men in his family by several years. As the years passed, Mantle frequently used a line popularized by football legend Bobby Layne, a Dallas neighbor and friend who also died in part from alcohol abuse: "If I'd known I was gonna live this long, I'd have taken a lot better care of myself."

Mantle's wife and sons all completed treatment for alcoholism and told him that he needed to do the same. He checked into the Betty Ford Clinic on January 7, 1994, after being told by a doctor that his liver was so badly damaged from almost 40 years of drinking that it "looked like a doorstop". The doctor bluntly told Mantle that the damage to his system was so severe that "your next drink could be your last." Also helping Mantle decide to enter the clinic was sportscaster Pat Summerall, who had played for the New York Giants football team at Yankee Stadium, by then a recovering alcoholic and a member of Mantle's Dallas-area country club. Summerall himself had been treated at the clinic in 1992.

Shortly after Mantle completed treatment, his son Billy died on March 12, 1994, at age 36 of heart problems brought on by years of substance abuse. Despite the fears of those who knew him that this tragedy would send him back to drinking, Mantle remained sober. Mickey Jr. later died of liver cancer on December 20, 2000, at age 47. Danny later battled prostate cancer.

Mantle spoke with remorse about his drinking in a 1994 Sports Illustrated cover story. He said that he was telling the same old stories, and realizing how many of them involved being drunk, including at least one drunk-driving accident, he decided they were not funny any more. He admitted that he had often been cruel and hurtful to family, friends, and fans because of his alcoholism, and sought to make amends. Mantle became a Christian when his former teammate Bobby Richardson, a Baptist, shared his faith with him. After the Oklahoma City bombing on April 19, 1995, Mantle joined with fellow Oklahoman and Yankee Bobby Murcer to raise money for the victims.

Early in 1995, doctors discovered that Mantle's liver had been severely damaged by both alcohol-induced cirrhosis and hepatitis C. They also discovered that he had an inoperable liver cancer known as undifferentiated hepatocellular carcinoma, which further necessitated a liver transplant. Mantle received the transplant at Baylor University Medical Center in Dallas on June 8, 1995. In July, he had recovered enough to deliver a press conference at Baylor, and addressed fans that had looked to him as a role model. "This is a role model: Don't be like me," a frail Mantle said. He established the Mickey Mantle Foundation to raise awareness for organ donations. Mantle returned to the hospital in late July, and the cancer was found to have spread throughout his body. Doctors observed that it was among the most aggressive cancers that they had ever treated, attributing the antirejection drugs administered to Mantle for his liver transplant with helping the cancer spread so quickly.

Mantle's popularity led to controversy over his liver transplant. Some felt that his fame had permitted him to receive a donor liver in just one day, bypassing patients who had been waiting much longer. Mantle's doctors insisted that the transplant was based solely on medical criteria, but acknowledged that the very short wait created the appearance of favoritism.

During Mantle's final days he made peace with his estranged wife Merlyn and repeated a request that he expressed decades earlier for Richardson to read a poem at his funeral.

Mantle died at 2:10 a.m. on August 13, 1995, at Baylor University Medical Center with his wife at his side, five months after his mother had died at age 91. He was 63 years old. His son David was also present. The Yankees played the Indians that day and honored him with a tribute. At Mantle's funeral, Eddie Layton played "Somewhere Over the Rainbow" on the Hammond organ because Mickey had once told him that it was his favorite song. Roy Clark sang and played "Yesterday, When I Was Young". The team played the rest of the season with black mourning bands topped by a number 7 on their left sleeves. Mantle was interred in the Mantle Family Mausoleum, located in the St. Matthew Section of the Sparkman-Hillcrest Memorial Park Cemetery in Dallas. In eulogizing Mantle, sportscaster Bob Costas described him as "a fragile hero to whom we had an emotional attachment so strong and lasting that it defied logic." Costas continued: "In the last year of his life, Mickey Mantle, always so hard on himself, finally came to accept and appreciate the distinction between a role model and a hero. The first, he often was not. The second, he always will be. And, in the end, people got it." Richardson read the poem at Mantle's funeral, which he described as being extremely difficult. Richardson recited the same poem (God's Hall of Fame), which was written by a baseball fan, at Roger Maris's funeral.

After Mantle's death, his family pursued a federal lawsuit against Greer Johnson, his agent and live-in aide during the last decade of his life, to prohibit her from auctioning many of Mantle's personal items, including a lock of hair, a neck brace, and expired credit cards. A settlement was reached allowing for the sale of some of Mantle's belongings for approximately $500,000.

Honors
Mantle was inducted into the Oklahoma Hall of Fame in 1964.

On Mickey Mantle Day at Yankee Stadium, June 8, 1969, Mantle's number 7 was retired and he was a awarded a bronze plaque to be hung on the center field wall near the monuments to Babe Ruth, Lou Gehrig, and Miller Huggins. The plaque was officially presented to Mantle by Joe DiMaggio. Mantle gave a similar plaque to DiMaggio, telling the huge crowd in Yankee Stadium, "Joe DiMaggio's deserves to be higher." In response, DiMaggio's plaque was hung one inch higher than Mantle's. When Yankee Stadium was reopened in 1976 following its renovation, the plaques and monuments were moved to a newly created Monument Park behind the left-center field fence, which has since been replaced by a new Monument Park at the current Yankee Stadium, which opened in 2009.

In 1969, Mantle received the Golden Plate Award of the American Academy of Achievement.

Shortly before his death, Mantle videotaped a message to be played on Old-Timers' Day, which he was too ill to attend. He said, "When I die, I wanted on my tombstone, 'A great teammate.' But I didn't think it would be this soon." Those words were carved on the plaque marking his resting place at the family mausoleum in Dallas. On August 25, 1996, about a year after his death, Mantle's Monument Park plaque was replaced with a monument bearing the words "A great teammate" and keeping a phrase that had been included on the original plaque: "A magnificent Yankee who left a legacy of unequaled courage." Mantle's monument now stands at the current Monument Park. Mantle's original plaque, along with DiMaggio's, are now on display at the Yogi Berra Museum and Learning Center, with the DiMaggio plaque still hung higher than Mantle's.

Beginning in 1997, the Topps Baseball Card company retired card #7 in its baseball flagship sets in tribute to Mantle, whose career was taking off just as Topps began producing them. Mantle's cards, especially his 1952 Topps rookie card, are extremely popular and valuable among card collectors. One of the 1952 cards (Topps; #311; SGC MT 9.5) sold for $12.6 million in August 2022. Topps unretired the #7 in 2006 to use exclusively for cards of Mantle in the current year's design. In 2017, Topps began including #7 cards in its main sets again, with Yankees catcher Gary Sanchez the first player other than Mickey Mantle to appear in the #7 slot since 1995. In 2018, the #7 card was issued to Yankees outfielder Clint Frazier. In 2019, the #7 card was issued to Yankees second baseman Gleyber Torres. In 2020, the #7 card was issued to right fielder Aaron Judge. The first main series #7 card not issued to Mantle or a Yankee was to shortstop Orlando Arcia of the Milwaukee Brewers in 2021.

In 1998, The Sporting News placed Mantle at 17th on its list of baseball's 100 greatest players. That same year, Mantle was one of 100 nominees for the Major League Baseball All-Century Team, and was chosen by fan balloting as one of the team's outfielders. ESPN's SportsCentury series that ran in 1999 ranked him No. 37 in its "50 Greatest Athletes" series.

A school in Manhattan was renamed for Mantle on June 4, 2002.

In 2006, Mantle was featured on a United States postage stamp, one of a series of four including fellow baseball legends Mel Ott, Roy Campanella, and Hank Greenberg.

A statue of Mantle is located at Mickey Mantle Plaza at Chickasaw Bricktown Ballpark, the home stadium of the Triple-A Oklahoma City Dodgers, 2 South Mickey Mantle Drive in Oklahoma City.

In August 2022, a 1952 Topps baseball card (Topps; 1952; #311; SGC MT 9.5) in mint condition sold for $12.6 million, a record for sports memorabilia at the time. It was originally purchased for $50,000 in 1991. This card is sometimes erroneously referred to as Mantle's rookie card, though Mantle had in fact appeared in the 1951 Bowman Baseball set.

Awards and achievements

Song and film appearances, depictions, and references

1956 - Mantle made a (talking) cameo appearance in Teresa Brewer's song "I Love Mickey", which extolled Mantle's power hitting. The song was included on one of the Baseball's Greatest Hits CDs.
1956 - Shorty Warren and His Western Rangers released a 45 RPM recording of "The Mighty Mickey Mantle".
1958 - Mantle appeared in the film Damn Yankees as himself in an uncredited role.
1962 - Mantle and Maris starred as themselves in the film Safe at Home! That same year's That Touch of Mink included a scene with Mantle in the Yankees' dugout with Roger Maris and Yogi Berra, sitting next to Doris Day and Cary Grant.
1980 - Mantle had a cameo appearance in The White Shadow, and in 1983, he had a cameo appearance in Remington Steele with Whitey Ford.
1981 - The song "Talkin' Baseball" by Terry Cashman names Mantle in the refrain, "Willie, Mickey, and the Duke".
1988 - Mantle appeared in the official video for Me and Julio Down by the Schoolyard by Paul Simon.
1989 - The song "We Didn't Start the Fire" by Billy Joel mentioned Mantle.
1993 and 1996 - References are made to Mantle in the sitcom Seinfelds episodes "The Visa" (1993), in which Kramer punches Mantle at a baseball fantasy camp, and "The Seven" (1996), in which George Costanza wants to name his future baby Seven after Mantle's uniform number.
1994 - Mantle appeared in Ken Burns's documentary Baseball.
1998 - Award-winning poet B. H. Fairchild published a narrative baseball poem Body and Soul that depicted the young Mantle in 1946.
2000 - American recording artist Tony Sciuto included the song "Mickey Mantle" on his Union of the Soul album.
2001 - The film 61*, directed by Yankee fan Billy Crystal, chronicled Mantle's and Roger Maris's chase of Babe Ruth's 1927 single-season home-run record in 1961. Mantle was played by Thomas Jane, and Maris by Barry Pepper. Mantle's son Danny and grandson Will appeared briefly as a father and son watching Mantle hit a home run.
2002 - In the Steven Spielberg film Catch Me If You Can, a scene set in 1963 references Mantle as part of a metaphor comparing the Yankees' iconic pinstripe uniforms to the importance of visual presentation when pulling confidence scams.
2003 - Tom Russell's album Modern Art included the song "The Kid from Spavinaw", chronicling the arc of Mantle's life and the ongoing relationship with his father.
2013–14 - The Broadway play Bronx Bombers included Mantle as a character.
2017 - Bleachers' album Gone Now included the song "Dream of Mickey Mantle".

See also

List of Major League Baseball players to hit for the cycle
50 home run club
500 home run club
List of Major League Baseball retired numbers
List of Major League Baseball home run records
List of Major League Baseball career home run leaders
List of Major League Baseball career hits leaders
List of Major League Baseball career runs scored leaders
List of Major League Baseball career runs batted in leaders
List of Major League Baseball career stolen bases leaders
List of Major League Baseball career total bases leaders
List of Major League Baseball batting champions
List of Major League Baseball annual home run leaders
List of Major League Baseball annual runs batted in leaders
List of Major League Baseball annual runs scored leaders
List of Major League Baseball annual triples leaders
List of Major League Baseball players who spent their entire career with one franchise
Major League Baseball titles leaders

Notes

ReferencesBibliography 
 SPORT magazine, June 1951
 
 
 
 
 
 
 
  Footnotes'''

Further reading
 "Signed By Yankees". The Brooklyn Eagle. September 24, 1950.
 United Press. "Mantle, Yanks' Rookie, Loses Duel With Sun". The Brooklyn Eagle. March 12, 1951.
 Holmes, Tommy. "Higher Education of Mickey Mantle". The Brooklyn Eagle. May 23, 1951.
 Burr, Harold. "Mickey Mantle Inherits Baseball's Biggest Job". The Brooklyn Eagle''. December 16, 1951.

External links

Mickey Mantle at SABR (Baseball BioProject)

1931 births
1995 deaths
People from Mayes County, Oklahoma
Alcohol-related deaths in Texas
American League All-Stars
American League batting champions
American League home run champions
American League RBI champions
American League Triple Crown winners
American people of English descent
Baseball players from Oklahoma
Baseball players from Dallas
Deaths from cancer in Texas
Deaths from liver cancer
Gold Glove Award winners
Independence Yankees players
Joplin Miners players
Kansas City Blues (baseball) players
Major League Baseball broadcasters
Major League Baseball center fielders
Major League Baseball players with retired numbers
Montreal Expos announcers
National Baseball Hall of Fame inductees
New York Yankees coaches
New York Yankees players
Liver transplant recipients
American League Most Valuable Player Award winners
Burials at Sparkman-Hillcrest Memorial Park Cemetery
People from Greensboro, Georgia
People from Commerce, Oklahoma
United Service Organizations entertainers